Mr. Gay International was the first international contest to select an Ambassador or spokesman to support the mission of the sponsoring nonprofit corporation, the Noble Beast Foundation. President of the Noble Beast Foundation is Don Spradlin, who founded and produced the first three Competitions with a team of dedicated volunteers. Carlos Melia, native from Argentina was the third International Mr Gay titleholder, elected and crowned in Los Angeles, California in 2008. The last International Mr. Gay titleholder was Pablo Salvador Sepúlveda from Chile. The competition has been de facto replaced by Mr Gay World.

Mission statement
"(To) advocate International Equal Rights by confirming the essential nature and contributions of gay men to a healthy society where "gay" is not a stereotype"

Media Coverage 

The event explicitly seeks to highlight discrimination against LGBTI people and provide select positive role models. A number of contestants from a number of countries has faced sanctions for their selection or competition, including Zoltan Parag from India, Taurai Zhanje from Zimbabwe, Robel Hailu from Ethiopia, former Olympian Chavdar Arsov from Bulgaria, Wendelinus Hamutenya from Namibia and Xiao Dai from China.

Titleholders

List of Mr Gay International titleholders

Mr Gay International competition
The third edition of International Mr Gay International took place in Los Angeles, California. Carlos Melia was crowned as IMG 2008, representing his country of origin as Mr Gay Argentina. As the title holder, Carlos worked as an ambassador and spokesperson for equal and human rights, fundraising and endorsing LGBT organizations and events worldwide. In 2009, Melia joined the Board of Directors of Mr Gay World, and appointed Executive Director of Central and South America and the Caribbean.

The next US Finale was held in San Francisco's Museum of Performance and Design in November 2008 when Michael Jarvis was named the US Delegate to the IMG. The International Competition was assigned to the Philippine producers for May 2009, in preparation for the first time the IMG Competition would be produced outside of the United States.

The international competition was scheduled for Manila in the Philippines for the summer of 2009, but encountered production issues that resulted in the competition being moved back to California.

The 2009 - 2010 Mr. Gay International titleholder was Switzerland's Ricco Müller. Rounding up the top five are Australia- 1st Runner Up, USA- 2nd Runner Up, Philippines, dethroned Mr. Fahrenheit 2007 Arthur Anthony Amurao Dimaguila, - 3rd runner up and Puerto Rico- 4th runner up). Ricco Müller is Artist, Traineeship Daniel Libeskind Architects. As International Mr. Gay Ricco Müller supports AIDS-aid campaigns, deaf community and attended Europride 2009.

In January 2011, Pablo Salvador Sepúlveda, activist and History teacher, competed in the International Mr Gay Competition and won the title. As International Mr. Gay, Pablo Salvador works for the LGBTIQ+ community supporting the first Chilean campaign against bullying at schools. The Educating in Diversity campaign was realized by Movilh and the Teachers Unnion (Colegio de Profesores). Pablo appeared on Radio and Television Stations in Chile as activist and spokesman.

See also

 Mr Gay World

References

Recurring events established in 2005
Transgender beauty pageants
LGBT beauty pageants
Annual events